CCFL is an initialism most commonly referring to Cold cathode fluorescent lamp.

CCFL may also refer to:

 Companhia Carris de Ferro de Lisboa, more commonly known as Carris
 Community College of the Finger Lakes, now known as Finger Lakes Community College